"You Move Me" is a song co-written by Gordon Kennedy and Pierce Pettis and originally recorded by American contemporary Christian music singer Susan Ashton in 1996. It was recorded by American country music artist Garth Brooks (Ashton had opened for Brooks on the second leg of his 1994 European tour and provided harmony vocals on his 1997 tour of Ireland) and was released as the fourth single from his album Sevens in 1998. It hit No. 3 on the Billboard Hot Country Singles & Tracks chart and reached No. 1 on the Canadian RPM Country Tracks chart.

Content
This song is a mostly acoustic mid-tempo song with electric guitar flourishes. The narrator talks about how his lover moves him, gets him off his feet, moves him forward, etc.

Chart performance

Year-end charts

References

Allmusic
CMT

1998 singles
1996 songs
Garth Brooks songs
Song recordings produced by Allen Reynolds
Songs written by Gordon Kennedy (musician)
Capitol Records Nashville singles
Susan Ashton songs